Václav Hladký (born 14 November 1990) is a Czech professional footballer who plays as a goalkeeper for  club Ipswich Town. He has previously played for Zbrojovka Brno and Slovan Liberec in his homeland, St Mirren in Scotland, and Salford City in England, and has represented his country at youth level up to under-20.

Career

Zbrojovka Brno
Having signed in 2012, he spent his first year as second choice goalkeeper behind Radek Petr, but was made first choice in 2013. He made his début on the opening day of 2013–14 season against FK Jablonec, managing to keep a clean sheet. During his time at the club, Brno goalkeeping coach Luboš Přibyl compared him to fellow Czech goalkeeper Petr Čech. On 18 October 2014, he was sent off against Sparta Prague. During the 2014–15 season he was dropped from the team after a series of mistakes, and by the end of the season declared he wanted to leave the club having fallen behind Dušan Melichárek as the club's number one.

Slovan Liberec
After signing in 2015, Hladký was second choice goalkeeper for over two years, initially behind Tomáš Koubek, signed on loan from Sparta Prague at the same time. He was selected for four league games in the autumn and was praised for his performances, which including keeping a clean sheet against Sparta Prague, and against Fastav Zlín in the Czech Cup.

He would remain backup, initially behind Martin Dúbravka, and then behind Ondřej Kolář, before getting his opportunity in the spring of 2018. He would be dropped the following season for Filip Nguyen, signed from second division Vlašim.

St Mirren
After falling back down the pecking order at Slovan Liberec, Hladký signed for St Mirren on an 18-month deal in January 2019. He quickly became a fan favourite at St Mirren Park, with goalkeeping coach Jamie Langfield saying he could be the player to keep St Mirren in the Scottish Premiership. He made the BBC's Scottish Premiership team of the week following his performance in a 1–1 draw with Heart of Midlothian.

On 26 May, St Mirren played out a 1–1 in the play-off final against Dundee United, meaning the two teams would play a penalty shootout; Hladký saved three of the four penalties he faced as St Mirren won the shootout 2–0 and therefore staying in the Premiership. Hladký dedicated the victory to his best friend Josef Šural, who died in a bus crash a month prior, and credited Langfield, St Mirren manager Oran Kearney and chief executive Tony Fitzpatrick for supporting him during the difficult moments.

In the summer, St Mirren rejected a £200k offer from Qarabağ, with new manager Jim Goodwin declaring him the best goalkeeper in the league. In June 2020, Hladký left Saints when he rejected the offer of a new contract.

Salford City
In August 2020 he joined EFL League Two side Salford City on a two-year contract. On his competitive début, an EFL Cup first round match against Rotherham United, he saved a penalty from Joe Mattock to send Salford through 4–2 after a shoot-out. In the delayed 2020 EFL Trophy Final played on 13 March 2021, Hladky saved the decisive penalty from Ronan Curtis to help Salford win 4–2 on penalties, having drawn 0–0 in normal time against Portsmouth.

Hladky was awarded the League Two Golden Glove award; he kept 22 clean sheets throughout the season, the most in the division, and he was named in the League Two Team of the Year by the Professional Footballers' Association as well as the EFL's League Two Team of the Season. Hladky's performances also saw him voted Salford's player of the season by the clubs' supporters, while Sky Sports named him in their team of the year for conceding 34 goals and saving 77.2% of shots faced, both league highs.

Ipswich Town
After just one season with Salford, Hladky was signed by Ipswich Town, signing a three-year contract.

Club statistics

Honours
Salford City
EFL Trophy: 2019–20

Individual
EFL League Two Golden Glove: 2020–21
EFL League Two Team of the Season: 2020–21
PFA Team of the Year: 2020–21 League Two
Salford City Player of the Season: 2020–21

References

External links

 Profile at FC Zbrojovka Brno official site

1990 births
Living people
Czech footballers
Czech Republic youth international footballers
FC Zbrojovka Brno players
Footballers from Brno
FC Slovan Liberec players
St Mirren F.C. players
Czech First League players
Scottish Professional Football League players
English Football League players
Association football goalkeepers
Czech expatriate footballers
Czech expatriate sportspeople in England
Expatriate footballers in Scotland
Salford City F.C. players
Ipswich Town F.C. players
Czech expatriate sportspeople in Scotland
Expatriate footballers in England